Capricorn is the debut solo album by former White Lion and Freak of Nature lead singer, Mike Tramp.

First released in France on the CNR Music label on October 17, 1997, the album was subsequently given a much wider distribution with the North American release on the 10th of February 1998 through CMC International, at which point Tramp commenced a solo tour in support of it.  The album was also picked up in Britain by Music for Nations.

Background
Tramp started working on the album following the split of Freak of Nature and the album features former Freak of Nature bandmates, guitarist Kenny Korade and bass player Jerry Best. Former White Lion bass guitarist James LoMenzo performed backing vocals on the album.

Release and promotion
The song "Better Off" was released as Tramp's debut solo single and features his first solo music video."Already Gone" was also released as a single for the album and "If I Live Tomorrow" was released as a promo single. "Take a Little Time" was released as an EP/Single titled "Leftovers" which included "Fears of Yesterday" and "Just a Dream" as B-sides.

Following the albums release Tramp reformed White Lion with all new musicians releasing the album "Remembering White Lion". Tramp also moved to Australia, with the aim of raising his son away from the rigors of big city life and to plan his next career move.

Track listing

Credits
 Mike Tramp - Vocals, Electric Guitar, Acoustic Guitar
 Kenny Korade  - Guitar
 Jerry Best - Bass guitar
 Dorian Crozier - Drums
 Kim Bullard - hammond
 James LoMenzo - Backing vocals

References

1997 debut albums
Mike Tramp albums